Microstele is a genus of minute air-breathing land snails, terrestrial pulmonate gastropod mollusks or micromollusks in the subfamily Pupillinae of the family Pupillidae.

Species
 Microstele alamellata Steklov, 1966
 † Microstele buryaki  Steklov, 1966  
 † Microstele caucasica  Steklov, 1966 
 † Microstele gerardae Karnekamp, 1990 
 † Microstele ikvae  Prisyazhnyuk, 1971 
 Microstele iredalei (Preston, 1912)
 Microstele mariae (de Morgan, 1920)
 Microstele muscerda  (W.H. Benson, 1853)
 Microstele noltei  (O. Böttger, 1886)
 † Microstele pingi Pilsbry, 1934 (taxon inquirendum)
 Microstele wenzi (K.Fischer, 1920)
Species brought into synonymy
 Microstele huberi Thach, 2018: synonym of Apoecus huberi (Thach, 2018) (original combination)

References

 Boettger, 1886: Ber. Senckenb. Naturf. Ges., 1886
 Marquet, R., Laenaerts, J., Karnekamp, C. & Smith, R. (2008) The molluscan fauna of the Borgloon Formation in Belgium (Early Rupelian, Oligocene). Palaeontons, Palaeo Publishing and Library, 12 : 100 p. 
 Bank, R. (2017). Classification of the Recent terrestrial Gastropoda of the World. Last update: July 16th, 2017. 
Seashells-Landsnails-Freshwater Shells. 3 New Genera, 132 New Species & Subspecies, p. 173 pp

External links
 GBIF: Microstele

Pupillidae